Slančji Vrh is a small nucleated village in the Municipality of Sevnica in east-central Slovenia. The area is part of the historical region of Lower Carniola. The municipality is now included in the Lower Sava Statistical Region. 

The local church is dedicated to Saint Ulrich and belongs to the Parish of Tržišče. It is a medieval building with a number of additions and rebuilding phases over the centuries.

References

External links
Slančji Vrh at Geopedia

Populated places in the Municipality of Sevnica